These are the official results of the 2011 South American Championships in Athletics which took place on June 2–5, 2011 in Buenos Aires, Argentina.

Men's results

100 meters

Heats – June 2

Final – June 2

200 meters

Heats – June 4

Final – June 4

400 meters

Heats – June 3

Final – June 3

800 meters
Final – June 4

1500 meters
Final – June 3

5000 meters
Final – June 2

10,000 meters
Final – June 5

110 meters hurdles

Heats – June 2

Final – June 2

400 meters hurdles

Heats – June 3

Final – June 3

3000 meters steeplechase
Final – June 4

4 x 100 meters relay
Final – June 5

4 x 400 meters relay
Final – June 5

20,000 meters walk
Final – June 5

High jump
Final – June 3

Pole vault
Final – June 5

Long jump
Final – June 5

Triple jump
Final – June 4

Shot put
Final – June 2

Discus throw
Final – June 4

Hammer throw
Final – June 3

Javelin throw
Final – June 5

Decathlon
Final – June 2–3

Women's results

100 meters

Heats – June 2

Final – June 2

200 meters

Heats – June 4

Final – June 4

400 meters

Heats – June 3

Final – June 3

800 meters
Final – June 4

1500 meters
Final – June 3

5000 meters
Final – June 2

10,000 meters
Final – June 5

100 meters hurdles
Final – June 2

400 meters hurdles
Final – June 3

3000 meters steeplechase
Final – June 4

4 x 100 meters relay
Final – June 5

4 x 400 meters relay
Final – June 5

20,000 meters walk
Final – June 5

High jump
Final – June 3

Pole vault
Final – June 2

Long jump
Final – June 2

Triple jump
Final – June 4

Shot put
Final – June 2

Discus throw
Final – June 4

Hammer throw
Final – June 2

Javelin throw
Final – June 5

Heptathlon
Final – June 4–5

External links

South American Championships
Events at the South American Championships in Athletics